Timothy "Tim" J. Conway is an American businessman and the founder, chairman and CEO of the NewStar Financial.

Career
Conway founded NewStar Financial in June 2004 and has been its Chairman, Chief Executive Officer and President since September 2006. From 1996 to 2002, Conway managed Corporate Finance and Capital Markets for FleetBoston Financial. Prior to joining Fleet, Tim spent 10 years as a Managing Director at Citicorp in New York.

Education
Conway received his bachelor's degree from Fairfield University in 1976 and MBA from the University of Connecticut.

Personal life
Conway and wife, Kathyrn, live in Boston, Massachusetts.  He is a member of the board of trustees at Fairfield University.  Conway Field at Rafferty Stadium on the campus of Fairfield University is named in recognition of Conway's contributions to the University.

References

External links
 Feim Financial profile

American chief executives of financial services companies
Living people
Fairfield University alumni
University of Connecticut alumni
Year of birth missing (living people)